Roy Lambert (born 16 July 1933) is a former professional footballer who played in The Football League for Rotherham United and Barnsley. He was a member of Rotherham's 1961 Football League Cup Final team.

Following his rather brief spell as a player at Barnsley, Lambert joined Huddersfield Town as their Youth Coach. He was also Chief Scout at one point.

References

English footballers
Barnsley F.C. players
Rotherham United F.C. players
English Football League players
Huddersfield Town A.F.C. non-playing staff
1933 births
Living people
Association football midfielders